The Stars in Euro Eyes 2001 was the first special European Soundmix Show.

It was held in Manchester, United Kingdom and was produced by Granada Television and ITV. The show was mainly made for the British audience, and not all competing countries aired the show on television. Belgium won the competition with Sonny O' Brien imitating Celine Dion.

Results

European Soundmix Show
Singing talent shows
2001 in music
2001 in British music